The 1964 Danish 1st Division (Danish: Danmarksturneringens 1. division 1964) was the 37th season of Denmark's top-flight association football division since the establishment of Danmarksturneringen's nation-wide league structure in 1927, and the 51st edition of the overall Danish national football championship since its inception in 1912. Governed by the Danish FA, the season was launched on 26 March 1964 with a clash between last season's third-placed B 1903 and Østerbro-based and local rivals B.93 with the last round of six matches concluding on 15 November 1964. Esbjerg fB were the defending league champions, having won their third consecutive league title last season, while BK Frem and B.93 entered as promoted teams from the 1963 Danish 2nd Division. Fixtures for the 1964 season were announced by the Danish FA's tournament committee on 6 January 1964, featuring a nine weeks long summer break.

The club leading the league table after the spring season's first eleven matches were awarded a berth to the 1964–65 European Cup preliminary round, while the winners of the 1963–64 Danish Cup would quality for the first round of the 1964–65 European Cup Winners' Cup — in case, it turned out to be the same team, the runners-up of the 1964 Danish Cup Final would instead quality for the European Cup Winners' Cup tournament. The overall league winners of 1964 qualified for the 1965–66 European Cup preliminary round. The Danish representatives in the 1964–65 Inter-Cities Fairs Cup first round became B 1913 (on behalf of Odense-Stævnet) and Kjøbenhavns BK (on behalf of Stævnet).

B 1909 won the league, secured their second Danish league championship on the final matchday in front of a record high attendance of 43,400 spectators at Københavns Idrætspark, the highest at a Danish league match in history, with Aarhus GF becoming the runners-up for the fourth time in the history. At the end of the season, the two clubs with the fewest points in the final league standings, Akademisk BK and Brønshøj BK, were relegated to the 1965 Danish 2nd Division. Jørgen Ravn of Kjøbenhavns BK was the league's top scorer for the second time, scoring 21 goals, three more than second-placed team mate Finn Møller.

Summary

The 1964 top-flight league was inaugurated early with a single Thursday match between B 1903, that had finished the 1963 season in third place, and newly promoted B.93 at Gentofte Stadium on 26 March 1964 in front of an audience of 3,100 spectators. B.93's Svend Petersen scored the season's first goal after 8 minutes of play via a header, following a pass from forward Walther Jensen and left wing Tom Søndergaard, but B 1903's knee-injured defender Henning Westergaard managed to draw the match 1-1 by netting in the second goal of the game in the 89th minute after B.93's goalkeeper Bent Jørgensen had lost the ball.

B 1909 claimed the league title on the final matchday, 15 November, with a 1–0 away win at Københavns Idrætspark in a top flight clash against another title contender Kjøbenhavns BK. The weather on that Sunday was cold, windy and raining, but the deciding match of season managed to attract a crowd of 43,400 spectators — it remains the official standing record attendance for a Danish league game. Before the last round, both teams were leading the league table, each with 29 points, followed by Aarhus GF in third place with 27 points — B 1909 held a slightly better goal average. The interest for the game was fueled by the fact that the past ten top-tier league seasons had been won by provincial teams, and that the game involved a Copenhagen-based team, which could reclaim the Danish league title — the first 41 editions of Danish national football championship had been won by a club from the capital. Despite the stadium being able to hold approximately 50,000 spectators at the time and no brewing unrest, the authorities decided the close the gates 15 minutes before kick-off due to fears of overcrowding. A good portion of non-payers had more or less illegally obtained a spot at the stands inside the stadium, while several thousand people outside the stadium could not get access.

The final match was won by B 1909 with a single goal netted by forward Mogens Haastrup in the 80th minute of play, following a pass from team mate John Danielsen, where Haastrup dribbled and eluded Kjøbenhavns BK goalkeeper Nils Jensen. B 1909 goalkeeper Svend Aage Rask, dressed in complete black, prevented several goal attempt from Kjøbenhavns BK's forwards, including Jørgen Ravn. Hungarian-Swiss Carlos Pintér was head coach for the Odense-based working class team in corporation with a match selection committee and had the following core players in the club's squad: goalkeeper Svend Aage Rask, defenders Leif Hartwig and Jørgen Rask, midfielders Arno Hansen, Erling Nielsen and Per Jacobsen, and forwards Palle Kähler, Walther Richter, Mogens Haastrup, John Danielsen and Mogens Berg. Palle Hansen, Mogens Engstrøm and Bruno Eliasen, who all appeared in the last game of the season, including Jørgen Petersen and Poul Erik Wiinberg, also played their part in the winning season.

BK Frem and B 1903 secured themselves another season in the top-flight division by winning their last games on 15 November 1964, 4–0 at home against Vejle BK and 3–1 away against B 1901, respectively. The decisive match for BK Frem took place at Valby Idrætspark in front of an audience of 3,000 spectators compared to the club's other home matches in the season, that had all been played at Københavns Idrætspark. Akademisk BK, who was also part of the relegation battle, won their last match away against B 1913, but ended up with just one point short in the final standings, so was relegated to the 1965 Danish 2nd Division along with Brønshøj BK.

Teams

Twelve teams competed in the league – the top ten teams from the previous season and the two teams promoted from the second-tier. The promoted teams were B.93, returning to the top flight after a four-year absence, and BK Frem, returning after a three-year absence. They replaced Aalborg BK and Køge BK, ending their top flight spells of one and three years respectively.

Stadiums and locations

Personnel

Coaching changes

League table
Every team played two games against the other teams, at home and away, totaling 22 games each. Teams received two points for a win and one point for a draw. If two or more teams were tied on points, places were determined by goal average. The team with the most points were crowned winners of the league, while the two teams with the fewest points would be relegated to the 1965 Danish 2nd Division.

Results

Statistics

Scoring

Top scorers

Hat-tricks

Clean sheets

References

Danish 1st Division seasons
Dan
Dan
1
Top level Danish football league seasons